Dendrobium plicatile is an Asian orchid species, a member of the genus Dendobium. It was formerly described as Flickingeria fimbriata.

Distribution 
The orchid's native regions include Southeast Asia, the Himalayas, and Malesia.

It is found in Borneo, Cambodia, South and Central China, Hainan, Himalayas East, India ( Assam), Java, Laos, Nusa Tenggara islands, Malaya, Nepal, Nicobar Islands, Philippines, Sulawesi, Sumatera, Thailand, and Vietnam.

Description
The methanol extract of D. plicatile has been shown to scavenge the superoxide anion radical ·O2−. Flower extracts from the closely related species Dendrobium officinale have also been proven to reduce fatty liver disease, oxidative stress, and inflammation, protecting against alcohol-induced liver injury.

From the stems, three phenanthrenes can be isolated, named plicatol A, B and C.

The plant also contains the norditerpenoids named flickinflimilins A and B and steroids.

References

External links 

Flickingeria fimbriata at orchidspecies.com

plicatile
Flora of tropical Asia
Medicinal plants of Asia
Plants described in 1965